CRN International is a radio marketing and promotions company.  

Some of its promotions include two-minute vignettes, contests, personality endorsements, retail marketing, social media and digital integration.

Since the company was founded in 1973, its clients have included:  Microsoft, Kraft, Chrysler, Johnson & Johnson, Hershey Foods, The Campbell Soup Company, Apple, The Navy, Unilever, PepsiCo and Nextel among others.

In 2009, CRN received MediaWeek Magazine’s Award for the Media Plan of the Year for Local Television and Cable.
Through the years it has won awards for its original use of media from a variety of organizations. CRN was included on the Inc Magazine list of 500 fastest-growing private companies in 1985 and 1986.

Its founder Barry Berman and his partner S. Richard Kalt were inducted into The Connecticut Business Hall Of Fame in the Class of 2006.

The roots of CRN International came from a company Berman founded, “Connecticut Radio Network,” which provided news, sports, weather and special programming for 55 Connecticut radio stations.  That company produced an independent ski report, New England Ski Watch for only Connecticut stations.  Its sponsor, Maxwell House Coffee, funded CRN’s expansion to broadcast local ski reports around the country. CRN ended its daily news service for Connecticut radio stations on June 9, 2017. 

By 1981, CRN International was producing programming and promotions in 45 states.  By 2000 CRN was creating campaigns that were broadcast in all 50 states, plus Canada and Europe. 

CRN International is headquartered in Hamden, Connecticut and has offices in New York City, Detroit, Los Angeles, Seattle, Minnesota, and Hershey.

References

External links
Official Company Website

Marketing companies of the United States
Companies based in New Haven County, Connecticut